Mikhail Nikolaievitch Rasputin is a fictional supervillain appearing in American comic books published by Marvel Comics. The character is the older brother of Colossus of the X-Men and Magik of the New Mutants. He first appeared in The Uncanny X-Men #284 (Jan. 1992).

Mikhail is a mutant with substance-altering and dimension-hopping abilities. He was a Cosmonaut and the Russian Federal Space Agency tried to test his powers by sending him on a suicide mission. He was the only surviving member of his crew and returned to Earth mentally unbalanced, harboring a dangerous messiah complex.

He sometimes collaborates his efforts with other villains such as Callisto, Omega Red, Apocalypse, and Mister Sinister.

Fictional character biography
The older brother of Colossus, Mikhail was a Soviet Cosmonaut and was believed dead after a faulty mission where his space shuttle exploded. However, it was later discovered that the explosion was set up by the government who learned of Mikhail's powers and wanted to exploit them without him being encumbered by ties to the past.

Mikhail was sent by his superiors into an inter-dimensional void, counting on his powers to keep him and his comrades safe, to see what was on the other side. He found a world, although he was the only survivor of his crew. He married Tra-Mai-A-Zath, daughter of the world's ruler, the Worldly Avatar, and soon became a messiah-like figure and found himself embroiled in a civil war. During the fighting, the rift was opened, and only Mikhail's powers could close it. He did so, but the backlash killed hundreds of his people, including his wife.

When a team of X-Men, with his brother Colossus, traveled through the re-opened rift to try and seal it, Mikhail had exiled himself into the desert. Eventually the team and Mikhail connected, and told that he had to close the void before it destroyed both this world and their home. However, having had one failed attempt that killed many, Mikhail was apprehensive to try it again. With the help of Sunfire, Iceman, and Jean Grey to control the energy backlash, Mikhail and the team were able to close the rift and return to Earth, without any loss of life.

Once back, however, Mikhail found it hard to adjust, and eventually went crazy, hearing and seeing his dead companions and loved ones in his mind, torturing him. He escaped the X-Mansion and fled into the near tunnels, where he met and set himself up as leader of the Morlocks, the tunnel-dwelling mutants beneath New York City. However after a battle with the X-Men, he collapsed and flooded the Morlocks' home.

The result being that many, including the X-Men, believed for a significant time that they all drowned to death, including Mikhail, which would become yet another source of grief in addition to the rest of his family's death, for Colossus in the near future. This eventually led to Colossus having a fallout with Xavier.

Mikhail did, however, survive, along with Callisto the former leader of the band of outcasts and a group of Morlocks who later descended to form Gene Nation. In a world where time moves faster than normal, Mikhail had established a citadel for himself on the top of a massive hill. The philosophy of "survival of the fittest" was the only thing which governed the society. If someone could reach the summit of the hill they were considered "fit" and worthy of being part of Gene Nation. Mikhail was forced to transport Storm and the Gene Nationals back to Earth, but he escaped once more (presumably back to the Hill) ranting about his benefactor being displeased with him. Storm then transported all of the Gene Nationals to a dying village in Africa where they would eke out a new life for themselves. It was discovered that Mikhail was working for the Dark Beast to try to propagate a group of elite warriors.

Legacy Virus
Distraught by the death of his little sister Illyana by the Legacy Virus, Mikhail decided to do something. Mikhail goes back and exposes his sister to the virus when she is in her aged form, thinking that with her magical abilities it would shield her from harm and help her to build an immunity. It was later revealed that Mikhail himself was suffering from the disease and was also trying to rid his body of the fatal virus. However, his plan backfired, and Illyana contracted the disease, her brother having been the one to administer it to her.

The Twelve
When Professor X temporarily disbanded the X-Men, Colossus took Marrow with him to Boston to see an art expo. While there, they were transported to the Hill by Mikhail Rasputin, and Colossus came face-to-face with his brother for the first time since his supposed suicide. The pair of X-Men ended up freeing Mikhail from the corrupting influence of a sentient energy native to that dimension and brought him back to the X-Mansion to recuperate when the entire team became embroiled in the gathering of the Twelve.

Mikhail was one of the Twelve, and one of the Horsemen breached the mansion's security to kidnap him. Colossus joined a strike force of X-Men who traveled to Egypt in order to confront Apocalypse, and his Skrull allies. In the resulting battles, Mikhail sacrificed himself to carry the Horsemen away from the conflict in a dimensional gateway. Although some Horsemen have reappeared since then, Mikhail did not reappear until X-Men: Colossus- Bloodline.

Colossus: Bloodline
Mikhail has made his reappearance and this time had allied himself with Sinister. The two were attempting to assassinate all of the members of the Rasputin family but one, so that the spirit of their forefather Grigory Rasputin may be concentrated and reincarnated in the last remaining member of the lineage. Mikhail teleported himself and his brother to another dimension that was a series of rocky caves. Not wanting to physically kill his brother, he decided to leave him in the rock dimension where he would die in a matter of weeks. However, away from Sinister for a period of time, he was able to overcome his mental manipulations and came to his senses, rescuing his brother. His final decision was to teleport to a world named The Dark Zone, a dimension from which it was impossible to return and also once entered, impossible to die in. This protected the rest of the Rasputin line from  the depredations of Sinister as at some point Mikhail would have been the sole surviving Rasputin, which would then trap his ancestor in the dark zone. Colossus tried to persuade him to save himself, but Mikhail determined that it would be best for the possible problem and for his own insanity.

After the events of M-Day, Mikhail has retained his mutant powers.

Dawn of X
Mikhail has since returned to Earth following the destruction and rebuilding of the entire Multiverse. When Krakoa was established as a Mutant nation, Homo Superior from around the world began gathering in this new homeland. However, Mikhail was among the few that refused this call and instead remained in Russia because he considered Krakoa to be a threat to the world. As a result, he formed an alliance with the anti-Mutant organization called XENO where he provided them support but only against Krakoa. While examining the corpses of XENO's enhanced soldiers in the Healing Gardens, Beast, Sage, and Cecilia Reyes were all shocked to discover that the soldiers were biologically engineered to have smaller agents nested inside. One of these small soldiers was able to steal the Cerebro Sword, murder Kid Omega with it, and used this dying body to access a Krakoa Gateway to Russia to deliver the sword to Mikhail Rasputin. 

After claiming the Cerebro Sword, he stabbed Quentin Quire and took the young Mutant to XENO's secret headquarters. He was aware that Quire would not die as his consciousness would be uploaded into a new body via the Resurrection Protocols. However, Mikhail decided to use his corpse as a source of genetic material that XENO could use in its arsenal of genetically engineered soldiers. Mikhail then presented the sword to The Man with the Peacock Tattoo and XENO.

Furthermore, Mikhail Rasputin began using a powerful reality-altering mutant known as the Chronicler to seize control of the country, effectively building up a mutant shadow government to run alongside that of Vladimir Putin. Mikhail also forced the Chronicler to take control of Colossus from afar. He made Piotr snap Kayla’s neck, a water-bending mutant who had begun a relationship with him, and cover up the evidence, thus gaining a mole inside X-Force, Krakoa’s own CIA - and eventually in the Quiet Council itself when Colossus was later elected to a vacant seat.

Powers and abilities
Mikhail's powers have always been rather ambiguous and have never fully been explained, but have been described as 'energy warping'. His role as a cosmonaut was to use his powers to protect the crew and vessel from the energies of the void they were investigating on Sakhalin Island. Whilst in the world he had entered through the void, he attempted to close it to protect both Earth and the other world; 'a source of energy that paralleled the void' was required, and Mikhail served 'in lieu of that powerful source', which indicates he could wield considerable energy. When the portal between the two worlds was later opened, and the X-Men came to Mikhail's world, he served as the focal point of the atomic power of Sunfire, the control of low temperature of Iceman, and the telekinetic fields of Jean Grey, wielding 'the untold energies of a thousand thousand stars' (sic). On his return to Earth, the traumatised Mikhail was shown to possess warping powers that could affect more than just energy, lashing out at a man delivering pizza and turning him into a tree, apparently killing him. Still wielding the inter-dimensional energies to which he was exposed traversing the void, Mikhail retained the ability to move between dimensions. He was able to extract from within his own body the Legacy Virus and transfer it to his sister, Illyana (reasoning that her older form, magically empowered, would be able to protect her and prevent her death). His apparent atomic or molecular control manifested in the ability to imbue inanimate objects with a degree of life; in his psychosis believing himself to be a god, Mikhail sought to animate a portrait of his deceased sister, but was dissuaded by his brother Colossus.

The Age of Apocalypse version is said to, "command energy and force fields." In various appearances he is shown to be able to manipulate the substance of matter on a subatomic level and warp energy wavelengths, allowing him to fire destructive blasts and teleport through space and dimensions although the full extent and limit of his powers are unknown.

Other versions

Age of Apocalypse
In the Age of Apocalypse, Mikhail was one of the Russian mutants that opposed Apocalypse's invasion. He caught Apocalypse's attention after he was able to kill War, one of the Horsemen of Apocalypse. Being impressed by Mikhail's victory, Apocalypse captured and brainwashed Mikhail. Mikhail became a Prelate and one of Apocalypse's Horsemen and was placed in charge of the central United States. He later led a group of Infinite Soldiers back to Moscow where he discovered his brother Colossus was the new leader of the Soviet Super Soldiers. This group fought valiantly but were no match for their former leader and all but Colossus were killed. Despite the months of brainwashing, Mikhail could not bring himself to kill his brother. Colossus almost broke through Apocalypse's brainwashing when the X-Men arrived, driving him away.

The months of experimental procedures and brainwashing he endured eventually made him lose his sanity, Mikhail went into seclusion and turned his powers into himself, significantly altering his physiology and appearance. He changed his flesh into a flesh-metal hybrid and opened up gateways in his own mind that gave him powers that even Apocalypse had never dreamed of. After years of mutating himself, Mikhail did not fear even Apocalypse himself. When Mikhail returned, Apocalypse gave him the added responsibility of being in charge of his Eurasian lands. Mikhail employed the Stryfe Force as his personal army, human servants that survived his Upscale Program, a program which turned ordinary humans into cyborgs under his control. At his side was his majordomo Keeper Murdock (the AoA version of Daredevil), who served Rasputin out of personal gratitude, as he believed his powers were the product of Rasputin's Upscale Program. Another of Mikhail's human allies was Bruce Banner, a scientist seeking to mutate himself, who obtained a supply of mutant test subjects in exchange for his aid.

Rasputin abandoned North America and approached the Human High Council with an offering of peace, which he didn't intend to fulfill. The Forgotten Horseman, as he was nicknamed, captured the Council Agents aboard his ships and planned on murdering the Human High Council leaders. His plan was to assume control of all Europe using the amplified powers of the captured Empath to manipulate the emotions of all humans. However, the Council agents took control of Rasputin's fleet. Mikhail was stopped from murdering the Council leaders by Donald Blake, who apparently killed the Horseman by stabbing him through the heart with his cane and pushing him out of the Big Ben, at the cost of his own life.

In other media

Video games
 Mikhail Rasputin appears in X-Men Legends II: Rise of Apocalypse voiced by Scott MacDonald. Mikhail is the second of the Horsemen of Apocalypse encountered when the X-Men fight him in the Savage Land. His appearance is more reminiscent of his character in the Age of Apocalypse storyline from Marvel Comics than his traditional look, which is understandable given the setting of the game. There were a lot references about him being Colossus' older brother, but he has no special dialogue with Colossus.  In this version, his powers include energy blasts, self-duplication, super-speed, and the ability to transform inanimate objects into minions.

References

External links
 Mikhail Rasputin at Marvel.com
 UncannyXmen.net Character Profile on Mikhail Rasputin

Characters created by Chris Claremont
Characters created by Dave Cockrum
Characters created by John Byrne (comics)
Comics characters introduced in 1992
Fictional astronauts
Fictional Russian people
Fictional Soviet people
Marvel Comics characters who can teleport
Marvel Comics characters with superhuman strength
Marvel Comics mutants
Marvel Comics supervillains
X-Men supporting characters